Lawrence Rosen may refer to:

 Lawrence Rosen (attorney), attorney and computer specialist
 Lawrence Rosen (anthropologist), American anthropologist and scholar of law

See also 
 Larry Rosen (disambiguation)